William Fisk may refer to:

 William Fisk (painter) (1796–1872), English painter
 William J. Fisk (1833–1909), American politician
 William Fisk (politician) (1871–1940), Australian politician
 William Henry Fisk (1827–1884), English painter and drawing-master
 Bill Fisk (1916–2007), American football player and coach
 William Fisk, a character in the 1956 film The Ambassador's Daughter

See also
 William Fiske (disambiguation)
 Willbur Fisk (1792–1839), American Methodist minister, educator and theologian